Leptini is a mountain village in the municipal unit Falaisia, southwestern Arcadia, Greece. In 2011 Leptini had a population of 43. Leptini is 1 km east of Akovos, 2 km west of Dyrrachio and 24 km south of Megalopoli. Leptini suffered damage from the 2007 Greek forest fires.

Population

See also
List of settlements in Arcadia

References

External links

 History and information about Leptini
 Leptini on the GTP Travel Pages

Falaisia
Populated places in Arcadia, Peloponnese